The Şenyurt-Mardin railway, also known as the Mardin railway, is a  railway in Southeastern Turkey. The railway branches of the Adana-Nusaybin railway, formerly the Baghdad Railway, at Şenyurt and runs north across a flat plain to Mardin. The line was built in 1918 by the Baghdad Railway, shortly before the Ottoman Empire surrendered in World War I.

External links
http://www.trainsofturkey.com/w/pmwiki.php/History/CIOB

Railway lines in Turkey
Standard gauge railways in Turkey